The following is a list of Kazakhstan women's national rugby union team international matches.

Overall 
Kazakhstan's overall international match record against all nations, updated to 29 October 2022, is as follows:

Full internationals

1990s

2000s

2010s

2020s

Other matches

Notes

References 

Kazakhstan
Rugby union in Kazakhstan